The Safely Kept Stakes is an American Thoroughbred horse race run annually at Laurel Park Racecourse in Laurel, Maryland. Open to fillies aged three, it is competed on dirt over a distance of seven furlongs. Run during October, it offers a purse of $100,000.

The Safely Kept Breeders' Cup Stakes is one of the top sprints for three-year-old fillies in the country. One of the few six-furlong contests with graded status for three-year-olds that leads to the Breeders' Cup Filly & Mare Sprint. It was inaugurated in 1986 as the Columbia Stakes. The stakes record is held by Godmother who finished the six furlongs in 1:09.21.

The race is named in honor of Jayeff "B" Stable's and Barry Weisbord's 1989 Eclipse Award Champion Sprinter and 1989 Columbia Stakes winner Safely Kept in 1996. The race has been called several different titles beginning with Columbia Handicap (after a nearby town in Maryland) from 1986–1987, then the Columbia Stakes from 1989–1995.

The race was at Pimlico Race Course in Baltimore, Maryland and has been moved to back and forth from Laurel to Pimlico depending on dates that were assigned by the Maryland Racing Commission. The race was held at Pimlico in 1986–1987, 1989, and 1991–1996. The race was run at Colonial Downs in New Kent, Virginia in 1997. The race was run at Laurel in 1988, 1990, 1998–2000 and from 2006 to present.  The race was run at  furlongs in 1987 and 1988.

The Safely Kept Breeders' Cup Stakes was given Graded stakes status in 1990. On August 7, 2008 it was announced that the race would be on hiatus for 2008, the Maryland Jockey Club cited financial distress as the reason for the races' cancellation.  The annual grading session of the American Graded Stakes Committee listed Safely Kept S. at Laurel Park not eligible for grading for 2010.

Records 

Speed record: 
 6 furlongs – 1:09.12 – Miss Indy Anna (1993)
 6.5 furlongs – 1:16.40 – Clever Power  (1988)
 7 furlongs – 1:23.68 – Who's In Town   (2014)

Most wins by a horse:
 No horse has won the Safely Kept Stakes more than once

Most wins by a jockey:
 3 – Mario Pino    (1996, 1997 & 1999)

Most wins by a trainer:
 2 – Kiaran McLaughlin    (2003 & 2004)

Most wins by an owner:
 2 – H. Joseph Allen    (1990 & 2003) 
 2 – Robert E. Meyerhoff   (1995 & 1998)

Winners of the "Safely Kept Stakes" since 1986

See also 
 Safely Kept Stakes top three finishers
 American Champion Female Sprint Horse

References 

 The 2007 Safely Kept Stakes at the NTRA
 Laurel Park Racecourse

Graded stakes races in the United States
Flat horse races for three-year-old fillies
Laurel Park Racecourse
Horse races in Maryland
Recurring sporting events established in 1986
1986 establishments in Maryland